The KDI Office Technology 200 was an annual 200-mile (321.869 km) NASCAR Gander RV & Outdoors Truck Series race held at the Dover International Speedway in Dover, Delaware. The race was the only race to be shown on tape delay during the past several seasons, but was televised live from 2012 to 2020.

The race was removed in 2021.

Past winners

2006 was the race time and average speed record.
2000, 2010 and 2018: The Race was extended due to a NASCAR Overtime finish.
2009: Race postponed from Friday to Saturday because of rain showers.
2012: Race shortened because of rain showers and darkness.
2020: Race postponed from May 1 to August 21 due to the COVID-19 pandemic.

Multiple winners (drivers)

Multiple winners (teams)

Manufacturer wins

References

External links
 

2000 establishments in Delaware
 
NASCAR Truck Series races
Former NASCAR races
Recurring sporting events established in 2000
Recurring sporting events disestablished in 2020